The chapters of the manga series Dogs: Bullets & Carnage are written and illustrated by Shirow Miwa and have been serialized in Ultra Jump since its premiere in the magazine's July issue on June 18, 2005. The prequel Dogs: Stray Dogs Howling the Dark, often shortened Dogs, was also serialized in Ultra Jump from 2000 to 2001. The series follows Heine Rammsteiner, Badou Nails, Naoto Fuyumine, and Mihai Mihaeroff, whose pasts connect them to the dystopic underground of extreme violence and genetic manipulation and the organization that runs it.

The individual chapters are published in tankōbon by Shueisha. Dogs: Stray Dogs Howling in the Dark was released on December 10, 2001.  The first volume of the Dogs: Bullets & Carnage series was released on October 19, 2006 and, as of August 20, 2014, ten volumes have been released. Every chapter in the Dogs: Bullets & Carnage series is released without a title and are given English titles in the tankōbon.

On November 19, 2008, it was announced that it was to be adapted into an anime series. The anime adaption of the prequel was released on two DVDs. The first was released with the fourth volume of Dogs: Bullets & Carnage on May 19,2009 and the second was released July 17, 2009 with a limited edition reissue of Dogs, which included new story material.

At the 2008 Comic-con International, Viz Media licensed the prequel for North American release. Dogs was released on April 14, 2009. It released the first volume on August 11, 2009, and as of June 16, 2015, ten volumes have been released.

Volume list 

|}

Chapters not yet in tankōbon format 
These chapters have yet to be published in a tankōbon volume.

95–101

Notes

References

External links 

 
 
 Official anime site
 ANN Vol 2 Review
 ComicBookBuun Vol 2 Review

Dogs: Bullets and Carnage